Bristol Aeroplane Company F.C. was an English football club based in Bristol, and was the works football team of the Bristol Aeroplane Company. The team played in the Western Football League before and after World War II, but left in 1950. They also participated in the FA Cup.

League history
Joining the Western League in time for the final season of football before World War II, Bristol Aeroplane Company F.C. had a successful season, finishing as runners-up to champions Trowbridge Town. After the war they fared less well, gradually dropping down the top division before finishing bottom and being relegated to Division Two in 1947–48. Life in Division Two was equally tough, with the club finishing third bottom and second bottom in the final two seasons before leaving the league at the end of the 1949–50 season.

The club fielded a reserve side in Division Two of the Western League for two seasons, the second season being particularly unsuccessful. When the first team was relegated, the reserves were dropped.

Bristol Aeroplane Company F.C.'s six seasons of Western League football are listed below.

Reserves

FA Cup history
Bristol Aeroplane Company F.C. entered the FA Cup for three consecutive seasons during the late 1940s, without scoring any goals. In their first Cup tie in 1947–48 they were defeated in the preliminary round 2–0 at Western League rivals Soundwell. They lost to local rivals again the following season, 1948–49, this time 4–0 at home to Hoffman Athletic in the Extra Preliminary Round. Their final attempt in 1949–50 resulted in a 3–0 Preliminary Round defeat at Troedyrhiw of the Welsh League.

Bristol Aeroplane Company F.C. won the Gloucestershire Senior Amateur Challenge Cup (South) in 1937–38 and 1942–43.

References

Defunct football clubs in England
Western Football League
Defunct football clubs in Bristol
Association football clubs established in the 20th century
Association football clubs disestablished in the 20th century
Works association football teams in England